Abdel Hussein Shandal is an Iraqi politician who was the Justice Minister in the Iraqi Transitional Government.

For the December 2005 elections he joined with Ahmad Chalabi's Iraqi National Congress in a list which failed to win any seats.

Sources
 Major Parties and Contenders for December Parliamentary Elections

Living people
Year of birth missing (living people)
Government ministers of Iraq
Iraqi National Congress politicians
Justice ministers of Iraq
Place of birth missing (living people)